David McKenzie (born 26 July 1967) is an Australian professional golfer.

McKenzie was born in Melbourne, Australia. He turned professional in 1990.

McKenzie has played on the PGA Tour of Australasia since 1990. After twice finishing second, at the 1994 Air New Zealand Shell Open and a playoff loss at the 2004 MasterCard Masters, he won his first Tour event at the 2013 Turner Plumbing Victorian PGA Championship. He played on the U.S.-based Nationwide Tour (2001, 2003–05, 2007–10), winning once, at the 2005 Gila River Golf Classic. He played one season on the PGA Tour (2006), where his best finish was 7th at the Valero Texas Open.

Professional wins (6)

PGA Tour of Australasia wins (1)

PGA Tour of Australasia playoff record (0–2)

Nationwide Tour wins (1)

PGA Tour China wins (2)

Other wins (1)
2011 Meriton Sydney Invitational

PGA of Australia Legends Tour wins (1)

Results in senior major championships

CUT = missed the halfway cut
"T" indicates a tie for a place
NT = No tournament due to COVID-19 pandemic

See also
2005 Nationwide Tour graduates

Notes

References

External links

Australian male golfers
PGA Tour golfers
PGA Tour of Australasia golfers
Korn Ferry Tour graduates
Golfers from Melbourne
1967 births
Living people